Jonas Poher Rasmussen (born May 19, 1981) is a Danish filmmaker. In 2021, he wrote and directed the animated documentary, Flee, that received three nominations for the Best Documentary Feature, Best International Film and Best Animated Feature at the 94th Academy Awards. From 2007 to 2010 Jonas attended the Danish independent film school Super16.

Life and career
He is originally from Kalundborg. He previously directed the short films Easa 2002: A Journey to Vis (2003), Something About Halfdan (2006), Closed Doors (2008), The Day After (2009) and House of Glass (2010), and the feature documentaries Searching for Bill (2012) and What He Did (2015).

Flee
The 2021 animated documentary film Flee tells the story of his friend Amin, an Afghan refugee in Denmark, and was one of the most highly-acclaimed and award-winning films of 2021.

Following Flee, Rasmussen signed with United Talent Agency and Anonymous Content to develop new projects. His first announced new project is based on the graphic novels of Danish writer Halfdan Pisket.

Filmography

Accolades
His film Flee has been nominated for Best Animated Feature, Best International Film and Best Documentary Feature at the 94th Academy Awards, a first in Oscar history.

References

External links

1981 births
Living people
Danish documentary film directors
People from Kalundborg